The Adelaide Giants are a professional baseball team that plays in the Australian Baseball League. They are one of the six foundation franchises of the league, in its first incarnation from 1989 to 1999. The team adopted the name Bite or Adelaide Bite when the league relaunched in 2010, officially Adelaide ETSA Bite, when the South Australian power company ETSA Utilities became its major sponsor. After an ETSA rebrand to SA Power Networks, the Bite became the "Adelaide Bite, proudly presented by SA Power Networks. In 2019, the team was rebranded as Adelaide Giants.

History

1989–1999

The Adelaide Giants were one of the foundation members of the original Australian Baseball League (ABL). They competed in all 10 seasons but however never once made the league's final playoff series, though they did appear in two Semi-Final series. They also have the novelty of winning the first ever ABL match against the Perth Heat in the 1989–90 season. Now members of the reformed Australian Baseball League, and after a spell known as the Adelaide Bite, the team is back to the original name of Giants.

During its original run from 1989 to 1999, ABL clubs were affiliated with Major League Baseball teams who would generally send Minor League prospects to play in Australia during the North American off season. The Giants were affiliated with the famed Los Angeles Dodgers and were only ABL team to stay affiliated with the same team throughout the history of the original ABL. One of the Dodgers Minor League prospects to play for the Giants was catcher Paul Lo Duca who was with the team in 1995–96. Lo Duca went on to make his Major League debut for the Dodgers in 1998 and would appear in four All-Star Games (2003–2006) before his retirement in 2008.

Giants infielder and Australian representative at the 1996 Summer Olympics Andrew Scott holds the ABL and club record for most appearances with 469 games played.

Adelaide Bite
During the 2010 through 2018 ABL seasons, the team was named the Adelaide Bite. That name was a reference to the Great Australian Bight – a nearby hydrographic landmark – as well as to the great white shark, a species which inhabits the coast of South Australia.

Adelaide's first general manager was former New York Yankees infielder Pat Kelly. He served as the General Manager from 2009–2013.

The team's former home ballpark was the historic Norwood Oval in Norwood, South Australia. They made the move to West Beach in the 2016/2017 season.

The Giants have multiple alumni who have played in the MLB in following years and many players who play for Team Australia in an international level. The team is made up of up-and-coming MLB draft prospects who play minor league baseball in the USA or established Australian players. Former big-league players often play in the ABL.

In 2018, the Adelaide Football Club bought the Adelaide Bite.

They sold the team to Pelligra in 2021.

2019 rebranding
The franchise rebranded as the Adelaide Giants in time for the 2019 ABL season, a move that marked a return to the identity that graced Adelaide's entry in the original incarnation of the ABL from 1989 to 1999.

2023
wins his first title the Championship Series

Game day atmosphere 
The Adelaide Bite were known for their unique sports atmosphere. Their speciality was the Shark Tank – a section where fans could sit on the field right next to the Adelaide Bite home dugout and interact with players. They also served a pig roast on the field as well as a drinks package.

The nature of baseball allows kids to run around and chase foul balls. They even can run on the field in-between innings. There are many catchy songs, quirky walk up music selections from the players, and many in-game activations.

In 2016, players from the Adelaide Football Club, Port Adelaide Football Club and Adelaide Strikers showed up to participate in a pre-game home-run derby that brought thousands of people to the stadium.

Various entertainers appeared for their games including Ethan Hall (or "Hiccup Kid") who sang the national anthem while hiccuping before a game. Other famous anthem singers include Darth Vader.

As the Bite, the team was known for its quirky off-field antics. On 1 April 1, 2016, the Bite fooled the world by announcing that baseball legend Derek Jeter would be joining the club as a player manager. It would have been the most high-profile signing in Australian sports' history. The practical joke garnered international headlines including a story in The New York Times and the Yankees' Twitter account.

Team Australia players

The Adelaide Bite have sent numerous players to represent the Australia national baseball team on various international stages including the World Baseball Classic, World Baseball Classic qualification, Olympic baseball and Honkbalweek in Haarlem.

Notable alumni
The Giants/Bite have seen 25 players move on to MLB after playing in Adelaide. Since the ABL reformed in 2010, Adelaide has 10 players progress to the Big Leagues:

These players are:

– Paul Lo Duca

– Steve Mintz

– Luke Prokopec

– Shayne Bennett

– Mark Hutton

– Adam Riggs

– Felix Rodriguez

– Will Brunson

– Pat Ahearne

– Matt Herges

– Jared Weaver

– Pat Kelly

– Brandon Bantz (2010–2011)

– James Jones (2011–2012)

– Brandon Maurer (2011–2012)

– Blake Smith (2011–2012)

– Ji-Man Choi (2012–2013)

– Andrew Kittredge (2012–2013)

– John Holzkom (2013–14)

– Brandon Dixon (2014–2015)

– Rocky Gale (2014–2015)

– Travis Demeritte (2015–16)

– Aaron Whitefield (2018–2021)

– Luke Williams (2021)

– Logan O’Hoppe (2019/20)

Adelaide is also home to five Helms Award Winners (MVP) since 2010. They are:

Andrew Scott (1997)

Jamie McOwen (2011)

Aaron Miller (2015)

Markus Solbach (2018)

Aaron Whitefield (2020)

Other notable alumni:

Brandon Maurer – Kansas City Royals pitcher, played for the Bite in 2010–11
Tom Brice – 2004 Olympic silver medalist for Team Australia
Rinku Singh – The subject of the film Million Dollar Arm. Played for the Bite in 2011–12.
Rocky Gale – San Diego Padres catcher. Played for the Bite in 2014–15.
Mitch Dening – Australian baseball player. Played in the top league in Japan for the Tokyo Yakult Swallows.
Chen Kuan-jen – Taiwanese baseball player. CPBL Rookie of the Year (2006). Played for the Bite in 2017–18.
Chang Tai-shan – Taiwanese baseball player. Holds record for all-time most CPBL home runs. Played for the Bite in 2017–18.

Results

1989–1999 results

Current club
The team has known heartbreak in the postseason. It has qualified for the playoffs in six of the ABL's ten campaigns since the league relaunched in 2010, advanced to the Australian Baseball League Championships Series four times, but has yet to win a title. As the Adelaide Bite, the franchise twice lost the championship series to the Perth Heat (2010–11 and 2014–15) and was bested by the Brisbane Bandits once (2015–16). As the Adelaide Giants, the team was defeated by the Melbourne Aces (2019–20).

Current roster

See also
List of current Australian Baseball League team rosters
Sport in Australia
Australian Baseball
Australian Baseball League (1989-1999)

Notes

References

External links 

 Australian Baseball League website
The Australian Baseball League: 1989–1999

 
Australian baseball clubs
Baseball teams in Australia
Sporting clubs in Adelaide
Australian Baseball League teams
Baseball teams established in 2009
2009 establishments in Australia